Charles Henry Ewing (May 28, 1866 – December 8, 1935) was an American engineer and businessman who was president of the Reading Company from 1932–1935.

Ewing was born in Warwick, Pennsylvania to James S. Ewing and Maria Potts. He was employed as a civil engineer. 

In 1921, Ewing was still Vice President of the line when disastrous head-on collision near Bryn Athyn, Pennsylvania, on the Newtown branch of the railroad, on December 5, caused the deaths of 27 people, including passengers, crew, and rescuers. Although an investigation had just begun (which would find error in company policies as well as operational errors on that day), Ewing issued a statement the following day placing blame on the crew of the northbound train, which had ignored an order to take a siding to allow another train to pass. Ewing declared, "We are wholly at a loss to account for this gross violation of the order and the rules, except that it was an unexplained failure of the human agency."

Ewing died of esophageal cancer in Cheltenham, Pennsylvania, aged 69.

References

External links

1866 births
1935 deaths
American civil engineers
20th-century American railroad executives
Reading Company people
Deaths from esophageal cancer